Agathotoma is a genus of minute sea snails, marine gastropod mollusks or micromollusks in the family Mangeliidae.

Description
Typical character of this genus: the spiral sculpture consists of fine, incised striae.

Species
Species within the genus Agathotoma include:

 Agathotoma aculea (Dall, 1919)
 Agathotoma alcippe (Dall, 1918)
 † Agathotoma angusta (Bellardi, 1847) 
 Agathotoma apocrypha (Garcia, 2008)
 Agathotoma asthenika Rolán, Fernández-Garcés & Redfern, 2012
 Agathotoma camarina (Dall, 1919)
 Agathotoma candidissima (C.B. Adams, 1845)
 Agathotoma castellata (E.A. Smith, 1888)
 Agathotoma coxi (Fargo, 1953) 
 Agathotoma ecthymata García, 2008
 Agathotoma eduardoi Rolán, Fernández-Garcés & Redfern, 2012
 Agathotoma finalis Rolan & Fernandes, 1992
 Agathotoma finitima (Pilsbry & Lowe, 1932)
 Agathotoma hilaira (Dall, 1919)
 Agathotoma kirshi Rolán, Fernández-Garcés & Redfern, 2012
 Agathotoma klasmidia Shasky, 1971
 Agathotoma merlini (Dautzenberg, 1910)
 Agathotoma neglecta (Adams C. B., 1852)
 Agathotoma ordinaria (Smith, E.A., 1882)
 Agathotoma phryne (Dall, 1919)
 Agathotoma prominens Rolán, Fernández-Garcés & Redfern, 2012
 † Agathotoma pseudolabratula Lozouet, 2015 
 Agathotoma quadriseriata (Dall, 1919)
 Agathotoma secalis Shasky, 1971
 Agathotoma stellata (Mörch, 1860)
 Agathotoma subtilis (Watson, 1881)
 Agathotoma temporaria Rolan & Otero-Schmitt, 1999
Species brought into synonymy
 Agathotoma badia (Reeve, 1846): synonym of Agathotoma candidissima (C. B. Adams, 1845)
 Agathotoma densestriata (C.B. Adams, 1850): synonym of Agathotoma candidissima (C. B. Adams, 1845)
 Agathotoma densilineata Dall W.H., 1921: synonym of Mangelia densilineata (Dall W.H., 1921)
 Agathotoma euryclea Dall, W.H., 1919: synonym of Agathotoma alcippe (Dall, 1918)
 Agathotoma metria (Dall, 1903): synonym of Vitricythara metria (Dall, 1903)
 Agathotoma pomara W.H. Dall, 1919: synonym of Mangelia pomara (W.H. Dall, 1919)
 Agathotoma pyrrhula Dall, W.H., 1919: synonym of Agathotoma alcippe (Dall, 1918)

References

 Smith, E.A. (1888) Diagnoses of new species of Pleurotomidae in the British Museum. Annals and Magazine of Natural History, series 6, 2, 300–317
 Cossmann, Maurice. Essais de paléoconchologie comparée. Chez l'auteur, 1899.

External links
  Bouchet, P.; Kantor, Y. I.; Sysoev, A.; Puillandre, N. (2011). A new operational classification of the Conoidea. Journal of Molluscan Studies. 77, 273-308
  Tucker, J.K. 2004 Catalog of recent and fossil turrids (Mollusca: Gastropoda). Zootaxa 682:1-1295.
 Todd, Jonathan A. "Systematic list of gastropods in the Panama Paleontology Project collections." Budd and Foster 2006 (1996)